EuroCity may refer to:

EuroCity, a rail network
EuroCity, a common name used by the twin towns of Tornio and Haparanda